The men's 500 metres races of the 2013–14 ISU Speed Skating World Cup 3, arranged in the Alau Ice Palace, in Astana, Kazakhstan, were held on 30 November and 1 December 2013.

Artyom Kuznetsov of Russia won race one, while his compatriot Dmitry Lobkov came second, and Ronald Mulder of the Netherlands came third. Mirko Giacomo Nenzi of Italy won the Division B race.

Keiichiro Nagashima of Japan won race two, while Mo Tae-bum of South Korea came second, and Artyom Kuznetsov added a bronze medal to his gold from race one. Roman Krech of Kazakhstan won the second Division B race.

Race 1
Race one took place on Saturday, 30 November, with Division B scheduled in the afternoon session, at 13:50, and Division A scheduled in the evening session, at 17:55.

Division A

Division B

Race 2
Race two took place on Sunday, 1 December, with Division B scheduled in the morning session, at 09:30, and Division A scheduled in the afternoon session, from 15:00.

Division A

Division B

References

Men 00500
3